A general election was held in the Northern Territory on Saturday 27 October 1990, and was won by the incumbent Country Liberal Party (CLP) under Chief Minister Marshall Perron.

The CLP's political strategy for the campaign, devised by the Chief Minister's media secretary, Tony-Barker May, involved attacking the opposition ALP's policy platform, and using the costings as the basis of a 'where's the money coming from?' media assault. Although the Chief Minister was ill for much of the campaign, government ministers made challenging statements every day.

The CLP also used the services of conservative social researcher Mark Textor, subsequently co-head of Crosby Textor Group, who made accurate polling predictions during this election, outperforming internal ALP polling and independent public polling. The result came as a surprise to most except for CLP insiders.

Six months prior to the election, polling showed the CLP was headed for a big loss. However, the CLP government remained in power with an increase of over 9% to its primary vote, holding 14 of the 25 seats, with the ALP opposition gaining 3 seats for a total of 9 seats in the Northern Territory Legislative Assembly. Meanwhile, the Northern Territory Nationals contested the election again, but lost both of their seats. The 1990 election also saw the Greens emerge in territory politics, with 3.05% of the vote—fourth behind the CLP, Labor and the Nationals.

Independents Noel Padgham-Purich and Denis Collins were both re-elected.

The NT Nationals lost both seats of Barkly and Flynn.

Retiring MPs

Labor
Dan Leo MLA (Nhulunbuy)

Country Liberal
Tom Harris MLA (Port Darwin)

Results 

|}

Candidates

Sitting members are listed in bold. Successful candidates are highlighted in the relevant colour.

Seats changing hands

Post-election pendulum 
The following pendulum is known as the Mackerras pendulum, invented by psephologist Malcolm Mackerras.  The pendulum works by lining up all of the seats held in the Legislative Assembly according to the percentage point margin they are held by on a two-party-preferred basis. This is also known as the swing required for the seat to change hands. Given a uniform swing to the opposition or government parties, the number of seats that change hands can be predicted.

References

Northern Territory Electoral Commission

Elections in the Northern Territory
1990 elections in Australia
1990s in the Northern Territory
October 1990 events in Australia